Myceligenerans cantabricum is a barotolerant bacterium from the genus Myceligenerans which has been isolated from deep cold-water from the Cantabrian Sea near Spain.

References

External links
Type strain of Myceligenerans cantabricum at BacDive -  the Bacterial Diversity Metadatabase	

Micrococcales
Bacteria described in 2015
Piezophiles